National Council of Government may refer to:

 National Council of Government (Haiti), provisional ruling body in Haiti (1986-1988)
 National Council of Government (Uruguay), former constitutional ruling body in Uruguay (1952-1967)